Thomas Troupe (born July 15, 1928) is an American actor and writer.

Biography
Troupe was born in 1928 and grew up in North Kansas City, Missouri, and studied with Uta Hagen at the Herbert Berghof Studio in Manhattan during the early 1950s. He made his Broadway debut in 1957 as Peter in the original Broadway production of The Diary of Anne Frank, which starred Joseph Schildkraut and Gusti Huber.

Primarily a stage performer, Troupe appeared in many plays over the years, including The Lion in Winter, The Gin Game, and Father's Day. He and his wife, Carole Cook, were jointly honored with the 2002 L.A. Ovation Award for Career Achievements. He appeared in such feature films as The Devil's Brigade (1968) and Kelly's Heroes (1970).

The Faculty (a Los Angeles acting school) was co-founded by Troupe and Charles Nelson Reilly. Troupe was married to actress Carole Cook from 1964 until her death in 2023.

Partial filmography

References

External links
 

American male stage actors
1928 births
Living people
20th-century American male actors
American male writers
People from North Kansas City, Missouri
American male film actors
Male actors from Missouri